Petrobras Transporte S.A. (Transpetro) is the largest oil and gas transportation company of Brazil. Transpetro works with transportation and storage activities of oil and byproducts, ethanol, biofuels and natural gas.

Transpetro, a fully owned subsidiary of Petrobras, was established on 12 June 1998, as per legislation (Act no. 9.478/1997) which restructured the oil sector in Brazil. In addition to Petrobras, Transpetro provides services to several distributing companies and to the petrochemical industry.

External links

Transpetro company website

Petrobras
Logistics companies of Brazil
Natural gas pipeline companies
Oil and gas companies of Brazil
Companies based in Rio de Janeiro (state)
Transport companies established in 1998
Shipping companies of Brazil
Non-renewable resource companies established in 1998
1998 establishments in Brazil